Wake Your Mind is the fifth studio album by German Trance duo Cosmic Gate. It was released on October 24, 2011 as a digital release on Beatport and October 31, 2011 on all other digital retailers.

Track listing 

Cosmic Gate albums
2011 albums